MegaChip is a round white potato variety with good tuber size, and specific gravity for making potato chips.

It was developed at Rhinelander Agricultural Research Station in Wisconsin and it was result of a cross between 'Wischip' and 'FYF85' after many years of selection and breeding. The cross resulting in Megachip was made in 1985. It produces high quality chips that have an excellent color both from the field and after storage at 7.2 to 10 degrees C.

Botanical features
 Medium-late variety for chipping
 Round-oval tubers with medium to large size
 Flesh is white and have a high specific gravity, and medium-long dormancy
 Leaves are dark green
 Has four to seven inflorescences per plant
 12 florets per inflorescence, and medium peduncle length

Agricultural feature
 High level of resistance to common scab
 Moderately resistant to foliar early blight, powdery scab, pink rot, dry rot, and soft rot
 Fairly resistant to shatter bruise
 Yields are stable from year to year

References 

Potato cultivars